Jimmy McGriff at the Apollo is a live album by organist Jimmy McGriff recorded at the Apollo Theater and released on Sue Records in 1963.

Reception 

The Allmusic review stated "There's no question; organist Jimmy McGriff and company cook up some steaming blues grooves on this live date. Beyond that, though, there is little that distinguishes this set from countless others in the same mold. McGriff and his band are a dynamo when they unite in churning, bluesy bluster. As individual players, however, no one here generates much in the way of a memorable performance.  ... To McGriff's credit, he pulls these talents together so they total something more than the sum of the parts".

Track listing 
All compositions by Jimmy McGriff except where noted
 "There Will Never Be Another You" (Harry Warren, Mack Gordon) – 6:15
 "We Four" – 5:45
 "A Thing for Jug" – 5:45
 "Red Sails in the Sunset" (Hugh Williams, Jimmy Kennedy) – 5:45
 "Lonely Avenue" (Doc Pomus) – 6:00
 "Frame for the Blues" (Slide Hampton) – 5:45

Personnel 
Jimmy McGriff – organ
Rudolph Johnson – tenor saxophone
Larry Frazier – guitar
Willie "Saint" Jenkins – drums

References 

1963 live albums
Jimmy McGriff live albums
Sue Records live albums
Albums recorded at the Apollo Theater